Lucía Pineda Ubau (born September 1973) is a Nicaraguan journalist. She is the news director of Canal 15 in Nicaragua.

Career
She studied at the Central American University (Managua). She reported Daniel Ortega's stepdaughter on sexual abuse victim who was allegedly committed by his stepfather Daniel Ortega and the investigation into corruption in the Arnoldo Aleman regime. She received the 2018 Press Freedom Grand Prix, which was presented by the Inter-American Press Association.

She was arrested on charges of "inciting violence and hate" and "promoting terrorism". The Committee to Protect Journalists, The Coalition For Women In Journalism and Reporters Without Borders condemned her arrest and called for her immediate release. She was released from prison on Tuesday 11 June 2019 in an amnesty granted by Daniel Ortega's regime to political prisoners.

References

1973 births
Living people
Nicaraguan journalists
Women non-fiction writers
Nicaraguan women journalists
Imprisoned journalists